Neelam Karki Niharika (born April 9, 1975) is a Nepalese novelist, poet and short-story writer. She is best known for writing Beli, Hawaan, Cheerharan and Yogmaya. Her first novel Maun Jeevan was published in 1994.

Literary career 
Her works are highly sought by newspapers, television and radio media. Her popularity extends beyond Nepal, especially in Nepali communities abroad. Her themes commonly cover male-dominated society, caste, class, poverty, corruption, and tyranny. She cites Parijat as an inspiration and influence in her books.

Yogmaya 
Yogmaya is one of her most popular works. Yogmaya is based on the life of female protagonist Yogmaya Neupane (1860-1941), a religious leader and women rights activists born in Bhojpur, who fought against the autocratic Rana regime. Karki's research and book is attributed to being a large influence on bringing Yogmaya to the Nepali mainstream.

Publications

Awards 
She won Padmashree Sahitya Puraskar for her novel Cheerharan in 2016. The novel was also shortlisted for Madan Puraskar. 

She won the Madan Puraskar for her novel Yogmaya in 2018. She is the fourth woman writer to win that award.

References

Living people
Nepalese women short story writers
Nepalese short story writers
Nepali-language poets
Nepalese women poets
21st-century Nepalese poets
Madan Puraskar winners
21st-century Nepalese women writers
Nepalese women novelists
Nepali-language writers
Nepalese writers
Padmashree Sahitya Puraskar winners
1975 births
Nepalese nurses